William Pembroke Fetridge (1827-1896) was a travel writer, publisher, bookseller and periodicals distributor. He lived in the Boston, Massachusetts area and in Paris, France.

Brief biography 

From ca.1848 W.P. Fetridge lived in East Cambridge, Massachusetts.
 His children included Henry Pembroke Fetridge.

Fetridge and Company operated in Boston from 1850 through 1855. In addition to publishing books on a wide variety of topics, the company also ran a retail shop that sold magazines, medical journals, law journals, and foreign news. The shop was known as the Periodical Depot or the Periodical Arcade, with entrances on both Washington Street and State Street.

In 1850, the Periodical Depot published and imported "English books," and served as agents for: Godey's Lady's Book; Harper & Brothers's publications such as Harper's New Monthly Magazine; Gleason's Pictorial Drawing-Room Companion; The Flag of Our Union; Fowler & Wells' phrenological works; Hollick's medical works; Graham's Magazine; Sartain's Magazine; Hunt's Merchant's Magazine and Commercial Review; James Braithwaite's Retrospect of Medicine; Rankin's Abstract of the Medical Sciences; Law Library; London Lancet; "the foreign reviews, ... British and foreign medical reviews, ... Democratic and Whig reviews, ... London newspapers."

The Periodical Arcade also sold Jacob Townsend's Genuine Sarsparilla; and "The Balm of a Thousand Flowers," a soap compound of "oil, ashes and alcohol." In 1851 proprietors of the Periodical Arcade included T.M. Fetridge and Thomas Wagstaff.

Harper's publishing company sent Fetridge to Europe around 1862 to compile a travel guide. The success of the first Harper's Hand-Book for Travellers led to updated editions in later years. Fetridge lived the last part of his life in Paris, where he died in 1896. His son Henry took over as chief editor and director of Fetridge's Handbooks for Travelers in Europe and the East.

Notes

References

Further reading

Selected publications of Fetridge & Co. 
 Warren Colburn. An introduction to algebra, upon the inductive method of instruction. 1851.
 Abner Forbes; J W Greene. Rich men of Massachusetts: containing a statement of the reputed wealth of about two thousand persons, with brief sketches of nearly fifteen hundred characters. 1852.
 Boston slave riot, and trial of Anthony Burns: Containing the report of the Faneuil Hall meeting, the murder of Batchelder, Theodore Parker's Lesson for the day, speeches of counsel on both sides, corrected by themselves, a verbatim report of Judge Loring's decision, and detailed account of the embarkation. 1854.
 Alexander Fraser Tytler. Universal history, from the creation of the world to the beginning of the eighteenth century. ca.1855.
 Ann S Stephens. The Old Homestead.  1855.
 Miss Pardoe. The Wife's Trials: A novel. 1855.
 Hannah Webster Foster; Jane E Locke. The coquette; or, The history of Eliza Wharton. A novel: founded on fact. 1855.

Selected works written by W.P. Fetridge 
 
 Harper's phrase-book; or, Hand-book of travel talk for travellers and schools. Being a guide to conversations in English, French, German, and Italian, on a new and improved method. New York, Harper & Brothers, 1868.
 The rise and fall of the Paris commune in 1871; with a full account of the bombardment, capture, and burning of the city. New York, Harper & Bros., 1871.

External links 
 WorldCat. Fetridge, W. Pembroke (William Pembroke)

American book publishers (people)
Businesspeople from Boston
Writers from Boston
19th-century American people
American travel writers
American male non-fiction writers
1827 births
1896 deaths
19th century in Boston
Bookstores in Boston
19th-century American businesspeople